In enzymology, a pyridoxamine-oxaloacetate transaminase is an enzyme that catalyzes the chemical reaction

pyridoxamine + oxaloacetate  pyridoxal + L-aspartate

Thus, the two substrates of this enzyme are pyridoxamine and oxaloacetate, whereas its two products are pyridoxal and L-aspartate.

This enzyme belongs to the family of transferases, specifically the transaminases, which transfer nitrogenous groups.  The systematic name of this enzyme class is pyridoxamine:oxaloacetate aminotransferase. This enzyme participates in vitamin B6 metabolism.

References

Further reading 

 
 

EC 2.6.1
Enzymes of unknown structure